William Gilbert (4 June 1856 – 4 January 1918) was an English cricketer.  Gilbert was a right-handed batsman who bowled right-arm roundarm fast.  He was born at Newick, Sussex.

Gilbert made a single first-class appearance for Sussex against the Marylebone Cricket Club at Lord's in 1879.  He was run out for 5 runs in Sussex's first-innings, while in the Marylebone Cricket Club's first-innings he took the wickets of Wilfred Flowers, William Kenyon-Slaney and Arnold Rylott, with Gilbert taking 3/14 from 23 overs.  He was dismissed for a duck by Rylott in Sussex's second-innings, with Sussex being bowled out for just 38 to lose the match by an innings and 74 runs.  This was his only major appearance for Sussex.

He died at Holborn, London on 4 January 1918.

References

External links
William Gilbert at ESPNcricinfo
William Gilbert at CricketArchive

1856 births
1918 deaths
People from Newick
English cricketers
Sussex cricketers